Peter Cameron is the name of:

 Peter Cameron (entomologist) (1847–1912), English entomologist who specialised in Hymenoptera
 Peter Cameron (minister) (born 1945), Scottish-born Church of Scotland minister convicted of heresy by the Presbyterian Church of Australia
 Peter Cameron (mathematician) (born 1947), Australian mathematician, joint winner of the 2003 Euler Medal
 Peter Cameron (umpire) (born 1951), former umpire in Australian football
 Peter Cameron (novelist) (born 1959), American novelist and short-story writer

See also
 Peter Cameron Scott (1867–1896), Scottish-American missionary